The  origin of water on Earth is the subject of a body of research in the fields of planetary science, astronomy, and astrobiology. Earth is unique among the rocky planets in the Solar System in having oceans of liquid water on its surface. Liquid water, which is necessary for life as we know it, continues to exist on the surface of Earth because the planet is at a distance, known as the  habitable zone, far enough from the Sun that it does not lose its water, but not so far that low temperatures cause all water on the planet to freeze.

It was long thought that Earth’s water did not originate from the planet’s region of the protoplanetary disk. Instead, it was hypothesized water and other volatiles must have been delivered to Earth from the outer Solar System later in its history. Recent research, however, indicates that hydrogen inside the Earth played a role in the formation of the ocean. The two ideas are not mutually exclusive, as there is also evidence that water was delivered to Earth by impacts from icy planetesimals similar in composition to asteroids in the outer edges of the asteroid belt.

History of water on Earth
One factor in estimating when water appeared on Earth is that water is continually being lost to space. H2O molecules in the atmosphere are broken up by photolysis, and the resulting free hydrogen atoms can sometimes escape Earth's gravitational pull (see: Atmospheric escape). When the Earth was younger and less massive, water would have been lost to space more easily. Lighter elements like hydrogen and helium are expected to leak from the atmosphere continually, but isotopic ratios of heavier noble gases in the modern atmosphere suggest that even the heavier elements in the early atmosphere were subject to significant losses. In particular, xenon is useful for calculations of water loss over time. Not only is it a noble gas (and therefore is not removed from the atmosphere through chemical reactions with other elements), but comparisons between the abundances of its nine stable isotopes in the modern atmosphere reveal that the Earth lost at least one ocean of water early in its history, between the Hadean and Archean eras.

Any water on Earth during the latter part of its accretion would have been disrupted by the Moon-forming impact (~4.5 billion years ago), which likely vaporized much of Earth's crust and upper mantle and created a rock-vapor atmosphere around the young planet. The rock vapor would have condensed within two thousand years, leaving behind hot volatiles which probably resulted in a majority carbon dioxide atmosphere with hydrogen and water vapor. Afterward, liquid water oceans may have existed despite the surface temperature of  due to the increased atmospheric pressure of the CO2 atmosphere. As the cooling continued, most CO2 was removed from the atmosphere by subduction and dissolution in ocean water, but levels oscillated wildly as new surface and mantle cycles appeared.

Geological evidence also helps constrain the time frame for liquid water existing on Earth. A sample of pillow basalt (a type of rock formed during an underwater eruption) was recovered from the Isua Greenstone Belt and provides evidence that water existed on Earth 3.8 billion years ago. In the Nuvvuagittuq Greenstone Belt, Quebec, Canada, rocks dated at 3.8 billion years old by one study and 4.28 billion years old by another show evidence of the presence of water at these ages. If oceans existed earlier than this, any geological evidence has yet to be discovered (which may be because such potential evidence has been destroyed by geological processes like crustal recycling). More recently, in August 2020, researchers reported that sufficient water to fill the oceans may have always been on the Earth since the beginning of the planet's formation.

Unlike rocks, minerals called zircons are highly resistant to weathering and geological processes and so are used to understand conditions on the very early Earth. Mineralogical evidence from zircons has shown that liquid water and an atmosphere must have existed 4.404 ± 0.008 billion years ago, very soon after the formation of Earth. This presents somewhat of a paradox, as the cool early Earth hypothesis suggests temperatures were cold enough to freeze water between about 4.4  billion and 4.0 billion years ago. Other studies of zircons found in Australian Hadean rock point to the existence of plate tectonics as early as 4 billion years ago. If true, that implies that rather than a hot, molten surface and an atmosphere full of carbon dioxide, early Earth's surface was much as it is today. The action of plate tectonics traps vast amounts of CO2, thereby reducing greenhouse effects, leading to a much cooler surface temperature and the formation of solid rock and liquid water.

Earth's water inventory 
While the majority of Earth's surface is covered by oceans, those oceans make up just a small fraction of the mass of the planet. The mass of Earth's oceans is estimated to be 1.37 × 1021 kg, which is 0.023% of the total mass of Earth, 6.0 × 1024 kg. An additional 5.0 × 1020 kg of water is estimated to exist in ice, lakes, rivers, groundwater, and atmospheric water vapor. A significant amount of water is also stored in Earth's crust, mantle, and core. Unlike molecular H2O that is found on the surface, water in the interior exists primarily in hydrated minerals or as trace amounts of hydrogen bonded to oxygen atoms in anhydrous minerals. Hydrated silicates on the surface transport water into the mantle at convergent plate boundaries, where oceanic crust is subducted underneath continental crust. While it is difficult to estimate the total water content of the mantle due to limited samples, approximately three times the mass of the Earth's oceans could be stored there. Similarly, the Earth's core could contain four to five oceans' worth of hydrogen.

Hypotheses for the origins of Earth's water

Extraplanetary sources 
Water has a much lower condensation temperature than other materials that compose the terrestrial planets in the Solar System, such as iron and silicates. The region of the protoplanetary disk closest to the Sun was very hot early in the history of the Solar System, and it is not feasible that oceans of water condensed with the Earth as it formed. Further from the young Sun where temperatures were cooler, water could condense and form icy planetesimals. The boundary of the region where ice could form in the early Solar System is known as the frost line (or snow line), and is located in the modern asteroid belt, between about 2.7 and 3.1 astronomical units (AU) from the Sun. It is therefore necessary that objects forming beyond the frost line–such as comets, trans-Neptunian objects, and water-rich meteoroids (protoplanets)–delivered water to Earth. However, the timing of this delivery is still in question.

One hypothesis claims that Earth accreted (gradually grew by accumulation of) icy planetesimals about 4.5 billion years ago, when it was 60 to 90% of its current size. In this scenario, Earth was able to retain water in some form throughout accretion and major impact events. This hypothesis is supported by similarities in the abundance and the isotope ratios of water between the oldest known carbonaceous chondrite meteorites and meteorites from Vesta, both of which originate from the Solar System's asteroid belt. It is also supported by studies of osmium isotope ratios, which suggest that a sizeable quantity of water was contained in the material that Earth accreted early on. Measurements of the chemical composition of lunar samples collected by the Apollo 15 and 17 missions further support this, and indicate that water was already present on Earth before the Moon was formed.

One problem with this hypothesis is that the noble gas isotope ratios of Earth's atmosphere are different from those of its mantle, which suggests they were formed from different sources. To explain this observation, a so-called "late veneer" theory has been proposed in which water was delivered much later in Earth's history, after the Moon-forming impact. However, the current understanding of Earth's formation allows for less than 1% of Earth's material accreting after the Moon formed, implying that the material accreted later must have been very water-rich. Models of early Solar System dynamics have shown that icy asteroids could have been delivered to the inner Solar System (including Earth) during this period if Jupiter migrated closer to the Sun.

Yet a third hypothesis, supported by evidence from molybdenum isotope ratios, suggests that the Earth gained most of its water from the same interplanetary collision that caused the formation of the Moon.

The evidence from 2019 shows that the molybdenum isotopic composition of the Earth's mantle originates from the outer Solar System, likely having brought water to Earth. The explanation is that Theia, the planet said in the giant-impact hypothesis to have collided with Earth 4.5 billion years ago forming the Moon, may have originated in the outer Solar System rather than in the inner Solar System, bringing water and carbon-based materials with it.

Geochemical analysis of water in the Solar System 

Isotopic ratios provide a unique "chemical fingerprint" that is used to compare Earth's water with reservoirs elsewhere in the Solar System. One such isotopic ratio, that of deuterium to hydrogen (D/H), is particularly useful in the search for the origin of water on Earth. Hydrogen is the most abundant element in the universe, and its heavier isotope deuterium can sometimes take the place of a hydrogen atom in molecules like H2O. Most deuterium was created in the Big Bang or in supernovae, so its uneven distribution throughout the protosolar nebula was effectively "locked in" early in the formation of the Solar System. By studying the different isotopic ratios of Earth and of other icy bodies in the Solar System, the likely origins of Earth's water can be researched.

Earth 
The deuterium to hydrogen ratio for ocean water on Earth is known very precisely to be (1.5576 ± 0.0005) × 10−4. This value represents a mixture of all of the sources that contributed to Earth's reservoirs, and is used to identify the source or sources of Earth's water. The ratio of deuterium to hydrogen may have increased over the Earth's lifetime as the lighter isotope is more likely to leak to space in atmospheric loss processes. However no process is known that can decrease Earth's D/H ratio over time. This loss of the lighter isotope is one explanation for why Venus has such a high D/H ratio, as that planet's water was vaporized during the runaway greenhouse effect and subsequently lost much of its hydrogen to space. Because Earth's D/H ratio has increased significantly over time, the D/H ratio of water originally delivered to the planet was lower than at present. This is consistent with a scenario in which a significant proportion of the water on Earth was already present during the planet's early evolution.

Asteroids 
Multiple geochemical studies have concluded that asteroids are most likely the primary source of Earth's water. Carbonaceous chondrites–which are a subclass of the oldest meteorites in the Solar System–have isotopic levels most similar to ocean water. The CI and CM subclasses of carbonaceous chondrites specifically have hydrogen and nitrogen isotope levels that closely match Earth's seawater, which suggests water in these meteorites could be the source of Earth's oceans. Two 4.5 billion-year-old meteorites found on Earth that contained liquid water alongside a wide diversity of deuterium-poor organic compounds further support this. Earth's current deuterium to hydrogen ratio also matches ancient eucrite chondrites, which originate from the asteroid Vesta in the outer asteroid belt. CI, CM, and eucrite chondrites are believed to have the same water content and isotope ratios as ancient icy protoplanets from the outer asteroid belt that later delivered water to Earth.

A further asteroid particle study supported the theory that a large source of earth's water has come from hydrogen atoms carried on particles in the solar wind which combine with oxygen on asteroids and then arrive on earth in space dust. Using atom probe tomography the study found hydroxide and water molecules on the surface of a single grain from particles retrieved from the asteroid 25143 Itokawa by the Japanese space probe Hayabusa.

Comets 
Comets are kilometer-sized bodies made of dust and ice that originate from the Kuiper belt (20-50 AU) and the Oort cloud (>5,000 AU), but have highly elliptical orbits which bring them into the inner solar system. Their icy composition and trajectories which bring them into the inner solar system make them a target for remote and in situ measurements of D/H ratios.

It is implausible that Earth's water originated only from comets, since isotope measurements of the deuterium to hydrogen (D/H) ratio in comets Halley, Hyakutake, Hale–Bopp, 2002T7, and Tuttle, yield values approximately twice that of oceanic water. Using this cometary D/H ratio, models predict that less than 10% of Earth's water was supplied from comets.

Other, shorter period comets (<20 years) called Jupiter family comets likely originate from the Kuiper belt, but have had their orbital paths influenced by gravitational interactions with Jupiter or Neptune. 67P/Churyumov–Gerasimenko is one such comet that was the subject of isotopic measurements by the Rosetta spacecraft, which found the comet has a D/H ratio three times that of Earth's seawater. Another Jupiter family comet, 103P/Hartley 2, has a D/H ratio which is consistent with Earth's seawater, but its nitrogen isotope levels do not match Earth's.

See also

Notes

Jörn Müller, Harald Lesch (2003): Woher kommt das Wasser der Erde? - Urgaswolke oder Meteoriten. Chemie in unserer Zeit 37(4), pg. 242 – 246, ISSN 0009-2851
Parts of this article were translated from the original article from the German Wikipedia, on 4/3/06

References

External links
 Dr. C's Ocean World: "How the Oceans Formed" (archived copy)
 Nature journal: "Earth has water older than the Sun"

Origins of water
Water on Earth
Beginnings
Hadean
Hadean events
Scientific problems
Water